A refrigerator is a cooling appliance comprising a thermally insulated compartment and a heat pump.

Refrigerator may also refer to:
Refrigerator (horse), an American racehorse
"The Refrigerator", nickname of William Perry (American football) (born 1962), former professional American football player
The Refrigerator (film) a 1991 horror film

See also
Refrigerator Bowl, an American college football bowl game between 1948 and 1956 in Evansville, Indiana
Refrigeration
Fridge (disambiguation)
Freezer (disambiguation)